A chief technology officer (CTO), also known as a chief technical officer or chief technologist, is an executive-level position in a company or other entity whose occupation is focused on the scientific and technological issues within an organization.

A CTO is very similar to a chief information officer (CIO). CTOs will make decisions for the overarching technology infrastructure that closely align with the organization's goals, while CIOs work alongside the organization's information technology ("IT") staff members to perform everyday operations. A CTO should be aware of new and existing technologies to guide the company's future endeavors. The attributes of the roles a CTO holds vary from one company to the next, mainly depending on their organizational structure.   

In the United States, the average salary for a CTO ranges between $130,000 and $195,000 per annum depending on the company's sector. According to a 2018 report from the InfoSec Institute, CTOs in the financial sector earn around $200,000, while e-commerce CTOs earn around $76,000.

History 
After World War II, large corporations established research laboratories at locations separate from their headquarters. The corporation's goals were to hire scientists and offer them facilities to conduct research on behalf of the company without the burdens of day-to-day office work. This is where the idea of a CTO focusing on the overarching technology infrastructures originates.  

At that time, the director of the laboratory was a corporate vice president who did not participate in the company's corporate decisions. Instead, the technical director was the individual responsible for attracting new scientists, to do research, and to develop products. 

In the 1980s, the role of these research directors changed substantially. Since technology was becoming a fundamental part of the development for most products and services, companies needed an operational executive who could understand the product's technical side and provide advice on ways to improve and develop.

This all led to the creation of the position of Chief Technology Officer by large companies in the late 1980s with the growth of the information technology industry and computer (internet) companies.

Overview 

A CTO "examines the short and long term needs of an organization, and utilizes capital to make investments designed to help the organization reach its objectives... [the CTO] is the highest technology executive position within a company and leads the technology or engineering department". The role became prominent with the ascent of the IT industry, but has since become prevalent in technology-based industries of all types – including computer-based technologies (such as game developer, e-commerce, and social networking service) and other/non-computer-focused technology (such as biotech/pharma, defense, and automotive). In non-technical organizations as a corporate officer position, the CTO typically reports directly to the chief information officer (CIO) and is primarily concerned with long-term and "big picture" issues (while still having deep technical knowledge of the relevant field). In technology-focused organizations, the CIO and CTO positions can be at the same level, with the CIO focused on the information technology and the CTO focused on the core company and other supporting technologies.

Depending on company structure and hierarchy, there may also be positions such as R&D manager, director of R&D and vice president of engineering whom the CTO interacts with or oversees. The CTO also needs a working familiarity with regulatory (e.g. U.S. Food and Drug Administration, Environmental Protection Agency, Consumer Product Safety Commission, as applicable) and intellectual property (IP) issues (e.g. patents, trade secrets, license contracts), and an ability to interface with legal counsel to incorporate these considerations into strategic planning and inter-company negotiations.

In many older industries (whose existence may predate IT automation) such as manufacturing, shipping or banking, an executive role of the CTO would often arise out of the process of automating existing activities; in these cases, any CTO-like role would only emerge if and when efforts would be made to develop truly novel technologies (either for facilitating internal operations or for enhancing products/services being provided), perhaps through "intrapreneuring". 

To fulfill the role of a company's CTO, a person must meet many qualifications such as the following: bachelor's degree, master's degree, certifications, years of experience within the relevant field, and technology-related management skills.

As technology has become essential in the business world, new positions continue to arise. A CTO, may additionally interact with a newer position, a Chief Security Officer (CSO), or more accurately referred to as Chief Information Security Officer. The role of a CSO in comparison to a CTO would be to protect the network from being penetrated which could lead to privacy and legal issues for the company. All executive positions relating to technology must collaborate within companies to have the best working infrastructure and will report to the CEO.

Notable CTOs  
Notable CTOs include:

 John Carmack 
 Mike Krieger 
 David Heinemeier Hansson
 Werner Vogels

See also 
 Chief creative officer
 Chief executive officer
 Chief innovation officer (CINO or CTIO)
 Chief scientific officer
 Chief security officer

References

Further reading 
 
 
  
Noble, Jason (2018). "Day in the life of a CTO" . CTO Academy

 
T
Management occupations